Oswald's is a private members club at 25 Albemarle Street in London's Mayfair district. It was established by Robin Birley in 2017.

History and membership
Oswald's is located at 25 Albemarle Street in London's Mayfair district. The club was established by Robin Birley in May 2017. Members of the Oswald's can store their own wine at the club. The club is named for the portrait artist Oswald Birley, the paternal grandfather of owner Mark Birley. The interior was designed by Tom Bell and Bruce Cavell. The house was formerly the site of the hairdressers Michael John. The interior features "Murano chandeliers, country house-like fireplaces and a cupola soaring to [a] cigar terrace". Oswald's was created out of a need for vintage wines at more affordable prices. The head chef of Oswald's is Gianluca Cossu, previously of 5 Hertford Street.

Writing in The Times, Damien Whitworth described the club as "a private dining club that has become one of the capital's most exclusive havens for senior members of the government, deep-pocketed donors, stars of show business looking to party privately, and members of the royal family". In early 2022 Oswald's was described by Annabel Sampson in Tatler as the "...most exclusive of London's private members' clubs". Oswald's has no social media accounts.

Prince William, Duke of Cambridge attended a dinner at the club in November 2021. In January 2022 Prime Minister Boris Johnson and his wife Carrie Johnson spent an evening at the club. Other Conservative Party politicians who are regular visitors include Michael Gove, Priti Patel, Liz Truss and  Nadhim Zahawi. The actress Amber Heard went to Oswald's with friends in the evening following the second day of the Depp v News Group Newspapers Ltd trial at the High Court. Other members are believed to include George Osborne, and Lord Rothermere, and Birley's mother Lady Annabel Goldsmith. The club has a large overlap of members with Birley's other Mayfair club, 5 Hertford Street.

References

External links

2017 establishments in England
British companies established in 2017
Buildings and structures in Mayfair
Gentlemen's clubs in London